Tom Cochrane and Red Rider is the fifth studio album by the Canadian rock band Tom Cochrane & Red Rider, released in 1986 The album earned Cochrane two Juno Awards for Composer of the Year and Group of the Year. A remastered version was released by EMI in 2004.

Commercial performance
The album reached #116 on the U.S. Billboard 200 chart in 1986. In Canada, "Boy Inside the Man" reached #27, "The Untouchable One" hit #70, "One More Time (Some Old Habits)" hit #85, and "Ocean Blues (Emotion Blue)" made #88. The album was certified Platinum in Canada.

Track listing

Personnel 

 Tom Cochrane - lead vocals, guitars
 Ken Greer - guitars, keyboards, backing vocals
 Ken Sinnaeve - bass guitar
 John Webster - keyboards

Additional personnel
 Graham Broad - drums, percussion
 Jorn Anderson - drums on "The Loading" and "One More Time"
 Paul Martinea - bass on "Love Under Fire"
 John Johnson - saxophone
 Wendy Davis  - backing vocals
 Billy Pilgrim - backing vocals
 Mission Singers - backing vocals

References

External links 

 Lyrics

Red Rider albums
1986 albums
Capitol Records albums